Ramularia rubella is a plant pathogen in Ascomycota that infects Rumex species. Infection produces reddish spots on leaves. The red color is caused by the production of rubellin, a photodynamic anthraquinone-derived phytotoxin. R. rubella was originally described from Rumex aquaticus in Germany; it has a wide geographic range on Rumex species. It is being investigated as a biological control agent of Rumex obtusifolius.

References

rubella
Fungal plant pathogens and diseases